Melitaea nevadensis is a species of butterfly of the family Nymphalidae.

Taxonomy
The name nevadensis originally referred to a subspecies of Melitaea deione, and later of Melitaea athalia, found in the Spanish Sierra Nevada.
At the beginning of the 21st century, molecular studies (mitochondrial DNA) have determined that the Melitaea athalia populations from southwestern Europe (mostly comprising subspecies M. a. celadussa, but also M. a. nevadensis) likely constitute a separate species from the nominal M. athalia that is widespread throughout the Palaearctic region. These butterflies are distinct genetically and morphologically in the structure of the genitalia.
This newly identified species has been referred to as Melitaea nevadensis, Melitaea celadussa or Melitaea helvetica.

Distribution
Melitaea nevadensis replaces Melitaea athalia in the Iberian Peninsula, in southeastern France, western and southern Switzerland, and most of Italy. In France and Italy, the ranges of these two species are separated by a broad transition zone where the specimens have intermediate morphological features.

Description
These butterflies are golden yellow or orange, with fine black markings.

Biology
Caterpillars feed on Plantago, Antirrhinum, Veronica, Linaria, Melampyrum, Digitalis and Pedicularis species.

References

External links
 Lepiforum
 INPN
 Inaturalist
 Lepi Net - Les Carnets du Lépidoptériste Français

Melitaea
Butterflies described in 1904